Aston Villa Football Club, commonly referred to as Villa, is a professional football club based in Aston, Birmingham, England. Founded in 1874, they have played at their home ground, Villa Park, since 1897. Aston Villa is one of the oldest and most successful clubs in England, having won the Football League First Division seven times, the FA Cup seven times, the League Cup five times, and the European Cup and European (UEFA) Super Cup once.

Aston Villa has been a leading English club since the 1880s, renowned for their short, quick combination passing under Scotsman George Ramsay, who was appointed as the world's first professional football manager in 1886. The club was influential in the sport's move to professionalism in 1885 and it was a Villa director, William McGregor who founded the world's first Football League in 1888.

George Ramsay's trophy haul of six League Championships and six FA Cups established Aston Villa as the most successful club in England, a position it held from the 1890s until the 1960s. Villa scored 128 goals in season 1930–31, which remains the all-time top-flight record, however the club began its first decline in the mid-1930s; the 1940s and 50s was generally a period of mediocrity followed by a steep decline in the 1960s which culminated in a takeover of the club by Doug Ellis in 1968 and Villa's first and only relegation to the third tier of English football in 1969–70. Villa returned to the elite from the mid-1970s under manager Ron Saunders, who led the club to a seventh top-flight league title in 1980–81. They became only the fourth English club to win the European Cup, in 1981–82, followed by the European Super Cup in 1982-83.

Aston Villa was a founding member of the Premier League in 1992, one of just three clubs to have been founding members of both the Football League and the Premier League. The club regularly qualified for European football in the 1990s, but following a period in which the club struggled to compete with the high levels of spending of the leading clubs, Doug Ellis sold his stake in the club to American billionaire Randy Lerner, whose ownership of the club ended with Villa's first and only relegation from the Premier League in season 2015–16. The club returned to the Premier League in 2019.

During its history Villa has spent 109 seasons in the top-flight, the second highest of any club, and provided 76 England internationals, also the second highest of any club. Aston Villa is currently ranked 5th in the all-time English top flight table, since its creation in 1888 and is the seventh most successful club in English football by competitive honours.

Villa have a fierce local rivalry with Birmingham City and the Second City derby between the teams has been played since 1879. There is also a local rivalry with West Bromwich Albion, with matches between the sides known as the West Midlands derby. The club's traditional kit colours are claret shirts with sky blue sleeves, white shorts and sky blue socks. Their traditional club badge is of a rampant lion. The club is currently owned by the NSWE group, a company owned by the Egyptian billionaire Nassef Sawiris and the American billionaire Wes Edens.

History

Formation and rise to prominence (1874−1886)

Aston Villa Football Club were formed in March 1874, by members of the Villa Cross Wesleyan Chapel in Handsworth which is now part of Birmingham. The four founders of Aston Villa were Jack Hughes, Frederick Matthews, Walter Price and William Scattergood, who were members of the chapel's cricket team looking for a way to stay fit during the winter months. Due to the lack of local football teams Aston Villa's first match was against the local Aston Brook St Mary's Rugby team. As a condition of the match, the Villa side had to agree to play the first half under Rugby rules and the second half under Association rules. Villa won their first game 1–0.

The infant club's fortunes changed forever when a young Scotsman called George Ramsay stumbled across the Villa players' practice match in Aston Park in 1876. He was asked to make up the numbers and they were amazed by his skills, they had never seen such a display of close ball control before. When the game was over, the Villa players surrounded him and invited him to join the club and become their captain. Word spread about how fine a player Ramsay was, spectators began turning up to watch the little man nicknamed ‘Scotty’. He also took charge of training, Ramsay later described the newly formed club's approach to the game as 'a dash at the man and a big kick at the ball'. Ramsay was influenced by the Scottish club, Queen's Park, who pioneered what became known as 'combination football' in his native Glasgow, the intricate passing game he introduced was a revolutionary move for an English club in the late 1870s.

Villa began to establish themselves as one of the best teams in the Midlands, winning their first honour, the Birmingham Senior Cup in 1880. The club would go on to lift the trophy 9 times in the next 12 seasons.

Victorian and Edwardian golden age (1886–1914) 
Following the professionalisation of football in 1885, the club decided that it needed a full-time paid manager. The following advert was placed in the Birmingham Daily Gazette newspaper in June 1886:

 Villa received 150 applicants for the role, but with his strong association with the club George Ramsay was the overwhelming choice of the membership. Thus on 26 June 1886, Aston Villa appointed what has been described as the world's first professional football manager. 
The following season Aston Villa rose to national prominence, as the first Midlands team to win the FA Cup in 1887. Villa's captain, the powerful Scottish centre-forward Archie Hunter became one of the game's first household names, being the first player to score in every round of the FA Cup. Aston Villa were one of the dozen teams that competed in the inaugural Football League in 1888 with one of the club's directors, William McGregor being the league's founder. Following the professionalisation of football in 1885, clubs needed regular income to pay their players' wages. Frequently friendlies were cancelled due to opponents' FA Cup or county cup matches or clubs simply failed to honour a fixture in favour of a more lucrative match elsewhere. McGregor took action after seeing Villa matches cancelled, to the increasing frustration of the club's fans, on five consecutive Saturdays. In March 1888, he wrote to the committee of his own club, Aston Villa, as well as to those of Blackburn Rovers, Bolton Wanderers, Preston North End and West Bromwich Albion, suggesting the creation of a league competition that would provide a number of guaranteed fixtures for its member clubs each season. Following two meetings between representatives of the leading clubs, the world's first Football League season began in September 1888 with 12 member clubs from the Midlands and north of England: Accrington, Aston Villa, Blackburn Rovers, Bolton Wanderers, Burnley, Derby County, Everton, Notts County, Preston North End, Stoke, West Bromwich Albion and Wolverhampton Wanderers.

Despite Villa founding the league, by 1893 they had yet to win it. Villa Committee Member Frederick Rinder was the instigator of a club meeting at Barwick Street in February 1893 that removed the committee running the club at the time. All fourteen committee members resigned and were replaced by a committee of five led by Rinder after he gave a rousing speech criticising the board's tolerance of ill discipline and players' drinking. On the pitch, manager George Ramsay was moulding a team that became renowned for its short, quick combination passing which saw Villa win its first league title in 1893–94; the season after that the club won its second FA Cup in 1894-95. This was followed by back-to-back League titles in 1895–96 and 1896–97.

Aston Villa emerged as the most successful English club of the Victorian era, winning no fewer than five League titles and three FA Cups by the end of Queen Victoria's reign in 1901. Villa's captain during this era was Birmingham-born forward John Devey, who enjoyed a successful partnership with the lightning-fast winger Charlie Athersmith and marshalling Villa's defence was the tough-tackling Scotsman James Cowan, who had an unrivalled sense of timing and anticipation. In 1897, the year Villa won The Double, they moved into their present home, the Aston Lower Grounds. Supporters coined the name "Villa Park"; no official declaration listed the ground as Villa Park.

Success continued into the Edwardian era, with Villa lifting the FA Cup for the fourth time in 1904–05, and a sixth league title in 1909–10. A further FA Cup triumph was achieved on the eve of the First World War in 1913, with the club narrowly missing out on winning a second Double, finishing runners-up in the league. Star-players during this era included Howard Spencer, the cultured defender who captained both Villa and England, and the prolific strike force of Joe Bache and Harry Hampton who between them scored 382 goals in claret and blue.

Relative decline and first relegation (1920–1939)

In January 1920, Billy Walker scored twice on his Villa debut in a 2–1 FA Cup first-round win over QPR; the club won the FA Cup for the sixth time that season and Walker went on to establish himself as Villa's star player of the 1920s, scoring a record 244 goals in 531 appearances, captaining Villa and England. George Ramsay retired in 1926, at the age of 71, his replacement Billy Smith was unable to continue Ramsay's success, in reality several other football clubs had caught up with Aston Villa, most notably Arsenal, who the club finished runners-up to in the league in 1930–31 and 1932–33. Despite missing out on the league title, Villa Park crowds were entertained by attacking football, the 128 goals scored in 1930–31, remains the all-time top-flight record to the present day. A remarkable 49 of the league goals that season were scored by centre-forward Tom 'Pongo' Waring, with another 30 goals from winger Eric Houghton.

The club appointed Jimmy McMullan as manager in 1934, however, the move proved disastrous, resulting in Villa's first ever relegation in 1935–36 after 48 years in the top flight. Villa struggled largely due to a dismal defensive record: they conceded 110 goals in 42 games, 7 of them coming from Arsenal's Ted Drake in an infamous 1–7 defeat at Villa Park. The club made seven signings and spent a staggering sum for the time of £35,500 trying to retain top-flight status at all costs, but were unable to buy their way out of trouble. Aston Villa, at the time one of the most famous and successful clubs in world football, was relegated in 1936 for the first time in its history.

Following relegation to the Second Division, the Villa board brought back the ageing former club chairman Fred Rinder, who said on his return "Villa have been a great club, are still a great club, and always will be a great club". He was vocal in his criticism of the board for its "almost total neglect of the reserve team, instead relying on paying big fees for ready made players". He believed that this change in policy from scouting and developing young homegrown talent led to a decline in the club's culture and style of play, which alongside a tolerance of ill-discipline in the players led to Villa's relegation. Rinder's first act was to travel to Austria to recruit the progressive coach Jimmy Hogan as manager. Within two seasons, Hogan had guided Villa back to the top flight as Second Division champions playing attractive free-flowing football. Hogan outlined his philosophy: "I am a teacher and lover of constructive football with every pass, every kick, every movement an object." He used to tell his players that "football was like a Viennese waltz, a rhapsody. one-two-three, one-two-three, pass-move-pass, pass-move-pass.". Unfortunately, the Second World War ended Hogan's project to restore Aston Villa to the top of the English game.

Mediocrity and Discontent (1945–1961) 
Like all English clubs, Villa lost seven seasons to the Second World War, and that conflict brought several careers to a premature end. Bumper crowds flocked to Villa Park following the war, 76,588 people attended the FA Cup quarter-final between Villa and Derby County in March 1946, which is the all-time record attendance at Villa Park. The team was rebuilt under the guidance of former player Alex Massie for the remainder of the 1940s. Star players of this era included the one-club man Harry Parkes, the Welsh centre forward Trevor Ford and inside-forward Johnny Dixon, however the club only achieved mid-table finishes throughout the forties and fifties, never finishing higher than 6th place in the league. The board came in for increasing criticism during this time, with the 1953 AGM described by the Sports Argus as "the longest and liveliest Villa meeting". Shareholders and supporters criticised the club's lack of youth development, recruitment and training methods. When Danny Blanchflower put in a transfer request in 1954 he said that "the club had grown fat and lazy on its old traditions and the decay was eating at the once solid foundations".

Despite narrowly avoiding relegation the season before, Aston Villa's first trophy for 37 years came in the 1956–57 season when another former Villa player, Eric Houghton led the club to a then record seventh FA Cup Final win, defeating the 'Busby Babes' of Manchester United 2–1 with Northern Irish winger Peter McParland scoring both goals. The team continued to struggle for consistency in the league though, which led to Eric Houghton being sacked in December 1958. His replacement Joe Mercer could not prevent the club being relegated for only the second time in their history in 1958-59. However, under the stewardship of Mercer, Villa returned to the top-flight in 1960 as Second Division Champions with a talented young side which became known as 'Mercer's Minors'. The following season Aston Villa became the first team to win the Football League Cup with England centre-forward Gerry Hitchens scoring an impressive 42 goals in 1960-61.

Deep malaise and revival (1961–1974)
Hitchens' goals brought him to the attention of Italian club Inter Milan, who offered him a large financial incentive to sign. He was sold for £85,000 in summer of 1961, his replacement, Derek Dougan was not a success and Villa slid backwards. Mercer's forced retirement from the club in July 1964, following a stress-induced stroke, signalled a period of deep turmoil and malaise. The most successful club in England had failed to keep pace with changes in the modern game; three of the five-man board of directors were over 70 years old, the club had neglected its scouting network and coaching structure and the club's finances were in a parlous state. This led to the club selling its top striker Tony Hateley to Chelsea for £100,000 in October 1966, without his goals Villa were relegated for the third time in its history, under manager Dick Taylor in 1967. The board even sold the club's training ground outside Villa Park for housing, leaving the team in the position of training on borrowed training pitches of local factory teams.

The following season the fans called for the board to resign as Villa finished 16th in the Second Division. With mounting debts and Villa lying at the bottom of Division Two, the board sacked Tommy Cummings (the manager brought in to replace Taylor), and within weeks the entire board resigned under overwhelming pressure from fans. After much speculation, control of the club was bought by London financier Pat Matthews, who brought in Doug Ellis as chairman in December 1968. Ellis later recalled that "you could write your name in the dust, window frames were rotting, the smell of failure and imminent financial ruin hung in the air"; one of their first acts was to raise £205,835 in a share issue which cleared the club's debts. Doug Ellis's first managerial appointment was the outspoken Scottish manager Tommy Docherty, who after initial success, was sacked after 13 months in charge with the club at the foot of Second Division. His replacement was former club captain and reserve team manager Vic Crowe, who could not prevent Villa being relegated to the Third Division for the first time in its history at the end of the 1969–70 season.

The following season Villa surprised everyone by beating Manchester United in the two-legged semi-final to reach the 1971 League Cup Final, in which the team played well but were defeated by two late Tottenham Hotspur goals. There was a renewed sense of optimism at Villa Park as the club was promoted to the Second Division as champions with average attendances of 30,000 and a record 70 points in 1971–72 season. Off the pitch, the board purchased the new 20-acre Bodymoor Heath Training Ground in December 1971, with a view to improving the club's youth development and coaching facilities.

Back among the elite (1974–1992) 

Following a 14th place finish in the Second Division, Crowe was replaced in August 1974 by Ron Saunders. He was a fitness fanatic, whose brand of no-nonsense man-management proved effective, with the club winning the League Cup the following season and, by the end of season 1974–75, he had taken Aston Villa back into the First Division and into Europe. One player who had been a mainstay of the Villa team throughout the rollercoaster of relegations and subsequent revival was fan-favourite Charlie Aitkin, who made 659 appearances at left back for the club between 1959 and 1976, making him Villa's all-time record appearance holder.

Aston Villa were back among the elite as Saunders continued to mould a winning team, finishing 4th in the league and winning a further League Cup in 1976–77, with the formidable strike partnership of Brian Little and Andy Gray, who became the first player to win both the PFA Young Player of the Year and PFA Players' Player of the Year in the same season.

The 1970s was an era of boardroom unrest at Villa Park. Ron Saunders had a strained relationship with Doug Ellis, who resented Doug's perceived interference in football matters. Over time Ellis became an isolated figure on the board, as the other directors sided with Saunders. He was ousted as chairman in 1975 to make way for Sir William Dugdale. He remained on the board until 1979, when he left the club after a protracted power struggle with majority shareholder Ron Bendall. With Ellis gone, Saunders became all-powerful as manager.

Villa achieved a seventh top-flight league title in 1980–81, with players such as Gordon Cowans, Tony Morley and captain Dennis Mortimer leading the club to its first top-flight title in 71 years. Remarkably, they did so using just 14 players, with seven players being ever-presents. Villa's Birmingham-born forward Gary Shaw was named 1980-1981 PFA Young Player of the Year.

To the surprise of commentators and fans, Ron Saunders quit halfway through the 1981–82 season, with Villa in the quarter final of the European Cup. Saunders had expressed his exasperation with the board at the lack of funds available to him to strengthen the team and fell out with the chairman Ron Bendall over the terms of his contract. He was replaced by his softly-spoken assistant manager Tony Barton who guided the club to a 1–0 victory over Bayern Munich in the European Cup final in Rotterdam courtesy of a Peter Withe goal in the 67th minute. Ten minutes into the final, Villa's first choice goalkeeper, Jimmy Rimmer, was injured and young substitute keeper Nigel Spink was called into action, having only made one previous appearance in the first team. Spink performed superbly, keeping a clean sheet, and helping Villa become only the fourth English club to lift the European Cup. 

The following season the defence of the European Cup ended in a quarter-final defeat to Juventus, but Villa won the European Super Cup, beating Barcelona 3–1 on aggregate. This marked a pinnacle though and Villa's fortunes declined sharply for most of the 1980s. Doug Ellis returned as chairman and majority shareholder in November 1982. The club was saddled with significant debts and questions had been raised by the police regarding fraudulent financial activity surrounding the building of the North Stand at Villa Park from 1980-82. The cost of the work was £1.3 million. An internal investigation found that £700,000 of the £1.3 million worth of bills were unaccounted for. A later report by accountants Deloitte found that there were "serious breaches of recommended codes of practice and poor site supervision." Ellis immediately set about trying to reduce the club's overheads. He informed the players that they needed to take pay cuts and told the manager Tony Barton that there was a need to reduce the playing staff. Saunders' team was broken up and not adequately replaced, culminating in the club being relegated in 1987, just five years after Villa had been crowned European champions.

However, Villa bounced back quickly, achieving promotion the following year under Graham Taylor and a runners-up position in the top-flight in the 1989–90 season with a fine side that included Paul McGrath, Tony Daley and David Platt. Following this success, Graham Taylor accepted the offer to take over as England manager in 1990.

24 years in the Premier League (1992–2016)
Villa were one of the founding members of the Premier League in 1992, one of just three clubs to have been founding members of both the Football League in 1888 and the Premier League, along with Blackburn Rovers and Everton. Villa finished runners-up to Manchester United in the inaugural season under the charismatic manager Ron Atkinson. His side lifted the League Cup in 1994, beating Manchester United 3–1 in the final, with goals from Dalian Atkinson and Dean Saunders, but the team struggled for form in the league and Atkinson was replaced by former Villa striker Brian Little in November 1994. Little assembled a young side which included players as Gareth Southgate, Steve Staunton, Ian Taylor and Dwight Yorke, leading the club to a fifth League Cup triumph in 1996, beating Leeds United 3–0 at Wembley. Villa finished fourth in the league that season, and fifth the season after.

Following a dip in form, Doug Ellis sacked Brian Little and replaced him with another former Villa player John Gregory in February 1998. One of his first matches in charge was the Uefa Cup quarter-final against Athletico Madrid, which Villa lost on away goals over two-legs. In the summer of 1998, Villa's star-player Dwight Yorke told Gregory he wanted to leave the club, to which Gregory was later attributed as saying that he "would have shot Yorke if he had had a gun in his office". He was transferred to Manchester United for £12.6 million in August 1998. Gregory managed four top-eight finishes in the league and took the club to an FA Cup final in 2000 with a side that included David James, Dion Dublin, Paul Merson and Gareth Barry but was unable to assemble a team capable of challenging for Champions League places. At the end of the season Villa's captain Gareth Southgate handed in a transfer request, claiming that "if I am to achieve in my career, it is time to move on." Gregory's frustration at the lack of investment in the team led to him publicly accusing the chairman Doug Ellis of being "stuck a time warp"; their relationship remained strained until Gregory resigned in January 2002.

Ellis appointed Graham Taylor for a second spell in February 2002, but a 16th place finish in the league led to his replacement with David O'Leary in June 2003. After a sixth place finish in his first season, Villa slid backwards to 10th and 16th place finishes under O'Leary, culminating in him leaving in the summer of 2006. 

After 23 years as chairman and single biggest shareholder (approximately 38%), Doug Ellis finally decided to sell his stake in Aston Villa due to ill-health at the age of 82. After much speculation it was announced the club was to be bought by American businessman Randy Lerner, owner of NFL franchise the Cleveland Browns. The arrival of a new owner in Lerner and of manager Martin O'Neill marked the start of a new period of optimism at Villa Park and sweeping changes occurred throughout the club including a new badge, investment in state-of-the-art facilities at the Bodymoor Heath Training Ground and significant investment in the squad in the summer of 2007. The first Cup final of the Lerner era came in 2010 when Villa were beaten 2–1 in the League Cup Final.

Just five days before the opening day of the 2010–11 season, O'Neill resigned as manager, despite three consecutive 6th place finishes, due to frustration in the lack of investment in the squad, following the sale of star players Gareth Barry, James Milner and Ashley Young. His replacement Gérard Houllier stepped down due to ill-health in September 2011, to be replaced by Birmingham City manager Alex McLeish, despite howls of protest from fans against his appointment. McLeish's contract was terminated at the end of the 2011–12 season after Villa finished in 16th place, and he was replaced by Paul Lambert.

In February 2012, the club announced a financial loss of £53.9 million, and Lerner put the club up for sale three months later. With Lerner still on board, but unwilling to spend following the stock market crash of 2008, the club was uncompetitive for several seasons, culminating in the 2014–15 season, when Lambert was sacked in February 2015 after the team managed just 12 goals in the first 25 league games, the lowest in Premier League history. Tim Sherwood succeeded him, and steered the club away from relegation while also leading them to the 2015 FA Cup Final. However,  the club sold two of its star players Christian Benteke and captain Fabian Delph in the summer transfer window and did not adequately replace them. Villa struggled in the 2015–16 season, and Sherwood was sacked following six consecutive defeats. He was replaced by Rémi Garde, who left after just five months with Villa lying bottom of the table; his reign included a club-record 19 game winless run. The club was relegated at the end of the season, ending their 29-year stay in the top flight.

Takeovers, Championship years and promotion (2016–present)
In June 2016, Chinese businessman Tony Xia bought the club for £76 million. Former Chelsea boss Roberto Di Matteo was appointed as the club's new manager, but was sacked after just 12 games following a poor start to the season. He was replaced by former Birmingham manager Steve Bruce. Bruce led the team to finish fourth in the 17/18 season, but lost in the 2018 EFL Championship play-off Final to Fulham.

After failing to secure promotion to the Premier League in the 2017–18 season, owner Tony Xia sought additional outside investment in the club. On 20 July 2018 it was announced that the NSWE group, an Egyptian company owned by the Egyptian billionaire Nassef Sawiris and the American billionaire Wes Edens were to invest in the football club. They purchased a controlling 55% stake in the club and Sawiris took over the role of club chairman, appointing Christian Purslow as CEO.

In October 2018, Bruce was sacked after winning only once in a nine match stretch. He was replaced by Brentford manager and boyhood Villa fan Dean Smith, with former captain John Terry and Richard O'Kelly as his assistants. Under Smith performances and results improved, with the team finishing fifth and reaching the playoffs again—helped on by a club-record 10 league game winning streak. They reached the 2019 EFL Championship play-off Final and defeated Derby County 2–1 to gain promotion back to the Premier League after a three-year absence.

On the eve of Villa's Premier League return, Recon Group's minority share ownership was bought out by NSWE, meaning Xia no longer had any stake in the club. In Villa's first season back in the Premier League the team battled relegation for most of the season but managed to avoid it with a 17th-place finish, staying up on the final day. In Villa's second season back in the Premier League, Smith oversaw an 11th-place finish, but was unable to persuade star player and captain Jack Grealish to remain at the club when Manchester City's British-record £100 million bid triggered his release clause. Following a poor start to the 2021–22 season, which saw seven losses in the club's opening 11 games, Dean Smith was dismissed.

Aston Villa appointed former Liverpool and England captain Steven Gerrard as head coach on 11 November 2021. Results under Gerrard were generally mixed, and after a poor start to the 2022–23 season in which Villa won just two matches and scored only 7 goals in their opening 11 games, Gerrard was sacked following a 3-0 defeat at Fulham on 20 October 2022. The club announced the appointment of four-time Europa League winning Spanish manager Unai Emery four days later.

Colours and badge 

The club colours are a claret shirt with sky blue sleeves, white shorts with claret and blue trim, and sky blue socks with claret and white trim. They were the original wearers of the claret and blue. Villa's colours at the outset were royal blue caps and stockings, royal blue and scarlet "striped" (in the context of the time, hooped) jerseys, and white knickerbockers, one of the club rules including a provision that "no member can take part in a match without wearing the above uniform". For a few years after that (1877–79) the team wore several different kits from all white, blue and black, red and blue to plain green. By 1880, black jerseys with a Scottish Lion Rampant embroidered on the chest were introduced by Villa's Scottish leaders William McGregor and George Ramsay. This remained the first choice strip for six years. On Monday, 8 November 1886, an entry in the club's official minute book states:

The chocolate colour later became claret. Nobody is quite sure why claret and blue became the club's adopted colours. Several other football teams adopted their distinctive colours including West Ham United, Burnley, Scunthorpe United and Turkish club Trabzonspor. Crystal Palace also played in Villa's colours until the 1970s.

A new badge was revealed in May 2007, for the 2007–08 season and beyond. The new badge includes a star to represent the European Cup win in 1982, and has a light blue background behind Villa's 'lion rampant'. The traditional motto "Prepared" remains in the badge, and the name Aston Villa has been shortened to AVFC, FC having been omitted from the previous badge. The lion is now unified as opposed to fragmented lions of the past. Randy Lerner petitioned fans to help with the design of the new badge.

On 6 April 2016, the club confirmed that it would be using a new badge from the 2016–17 season after consulting fan groups for suggestions. The lion in the new badge has claws added to it, and the word "Prepared" was removed to increase the size of the lion and club initials in the badge. In November 2022, following a fan-led vote, the club announced it would adopt a new badge for the following season.

Kit sponsorship 
Aston Villa's kit was produced by local manufacturers until 1974, when Umbro became the first kit supplier to have its logo on a Villa shirt. Since then, the kit has been manufactured by a number of different suppliers including Le Coq Sportif, Reebok, Nike and Kappa. Aston Villa's first shirt sponsor was Davenports Breweries in the 1982–83 season. Since then, shirts have borne the logos of a number of local and national companies including AST Computers and Rover. Aston Villa forwent commercial kit sponsorship for the 2008–09 and 2009–10 seasons; instead advertising the charity Acorns Children's Hospice, the first deal of its kind in Premier League history. The partnership continued until 2010 when a commercial sponsor replaced Acorns, with the hospice becoming the club's Official Charity Partner. In 2014–15, the Acorns name returned to Aston Villa's home and away shirts, but only for children's shirts re-affirming the club's support for the children's charity. A shirt sleeve sponsor was used for the first time in the 2019–20 season with BR88 being displayed. The kit manufacturer for the 2022–23 season is Castore with car sales website Cazoo as the shirt sponsor and gambling company Kaiyun Sports as the sleeve sponsor.

Stadium 

Aston Villa's current home venue is Villa Park; the team previously played at Aston Park (1874–1876) and Wellington Road (1876–1897). Villa Park is the largest football stadium in the English Midlands, and the eighth largest stadium in England. It has hosted 16 England internationals at senior level, the first in 1899, and the most recent in 2005. Thus, it was the first English ground to stage international football in three different centuries. Villa Park is the most used stadium in FA Cup semi-final history, having hosted 55 semi-finals. In 2022, the club announced plans to rebuild the North Stand and part of the Trinity Road stand, which will take the maximum capacity over 50,000.

The current training ground is located at Bodymoor Heath near Kingsbury in north Warwickshire, the site for which was purchased by former chairman Doug Ellis in the early 1970s from a local farmer. Although Bodymoor Heath was state-of-the-art in the 1970s, by the late 1990s the facilities had started to look dated. In November 2005, Ellis and Aston Villa plc announced a state of the art £13 million redevelopment of Bodymoor in two phases. The new training ground was officially unveiled on 6 May 2007, by then manager Martin O'Neill, then team captain Gareth Barry and 1982 European Cup winning team captain Dennis Mortimer, with the Aston Villa squad moving in for the 2007–08 season.

It was announced on 6 August 2014, that Villa Park would appear in the FIFA video game from FIFA 15, with all other Premier League stadiums also fully licensed from this game onwards.

Ownership 

The first shares in the club were issued towards the end of the 19th century as a result of legislation that was intended to codify the growing numbers of professional teams and players in the Association Football leagues. FA teams were required to distribute shares to investors as a way of facilitating trading among the teams without implicating the FA itself. This trading continued for much of the 20th century until Ellis started buying up many of the shares in the 1960s. He was chairman and substantial shareholder of "Aston Villa F.C." from 1968 to 1975 and the majority shareholder from 1982 to 2006. The club were floated on the London Stock Exchange (LSE) in 1996, and the share price fluctuated in the ten years after the flotation. In 2006 it was announced that several consortia and individuals were considering bids for Aston Villa.

On 14 August 2006, it was confirmed that Randy Lerner, then owner of the National Football League's Cleveland Browns, had reached an agreement of £62.6 million with Aston Villa for a takeover of the club. Lerner took full control on 18 September with Ellis and his board replaced with a new board by Lerner on 19 September 2006. Lerner appointed himself Chairman of the club with Charles Krulak as a non-executive director and Ellis awarded the honorary position of Chairman Emeritus. Lerner put the club up for sale in May 2014, valuing it at an estimated £200 million.

On 18 May 2016, Randy Lerner agreed the sale of Aston Villa to Recon Group, owned by Chinese businessman Xia Jiantong. The sale was completed on 14 June 2016 for a reported £76 million after being approved by the Football League, with the club becoming part of Recon Group's Sport, Leisure and Tourism division. Recon Group were selected to take over Aston Villa following a selection process by the club.

After failing to secure promotion to the Premier League in the 2017–18 season speculation about financial difficulties at the club began to mount. This prompted the owner Tony Xia to seek additional investment. On 20 July 2018 it was announced that the NSWE group, an Egyptian company owned by the Egyptian billionaire Nassef Sawiris and the American billionaire Wes Edens were to invest in the football club. They purchased a controlling 55% stake in the club and Sawiris took over the role of club chairman. On 9 August 2019, on the eve of Villa's Premier League return, documents from Companies House revealed that Recon Group's minority share ownership had been bought out, and Dr. Tony Xia no longer had any stake in the club.

Social responsibility 
Aston Villa has a unique relationship with the Acorns Children's Hospice charity that is groundbreaking in English football. In a first for the Premier League, Aston Villa donated the front of its kit shirts, usually reserved for high-paying sponsorships, to Acorns Hospice so that the charity would gain significant additional visibility and more funds. Outside of the shirt sponsorship the club has paid for hospice care for the charity as well as regularly providing player visits to hospice locations.

In September 2010, Aston Villa launched an initiative at Villa Park called Villa Midlands Food (VMF) where the club will spend two years training students with Aston Villa hospitality and events in association with Birmingham City Council. The club opened a restaurant in the Trinity Road Stand staffed with 12 students recruited from within a 10-mile (16 km) radius of Villa Park with most of the food served in the restaurant sourced locally.

Aston Villa Foundation 
In 2016, Aston Villa created a registered charity, the Aston Villa Foundation. The aim of the charity is to deliver the social responsibility work of Aston Villa. Working alongside key local and national stakeholders, the Foundation delivers projects such as football in the community, disability, health and wellbeing, education, interventions and community relations.

In May 2021, Prince William, Duke of Cambridge met with members of the Foundation at Aston Villa's Bodymoor Heath Training Ground. This was following the Foundation providing 1000 hot meals a week to local organisations during the COVID-19 pandemic in the United Kingdom as well as allowing a local NHS Trust to make use of Villa Park's facilities.

Supporters and rivalries 

Aston Villa have a large fanbase and draw support from all over the Midlands and beyond, with supporters' clubs all across the world. Former Villa chief executive Richard Fitzgerald has stated that the ethnicity of the supporters is currently 98% white. When Randy Lerner's regime took over at Villa Park, they aimed to improve the support from ethnic minorities. A number of organisations have been set up to support the local community, including Aston Pride. A Villa in the Community programme has also been set up to encourage support among young people in the region. The new owners have also initiated several surveys aimed at gaining the opinions of Villa fans and to involve them in the decision making process. Meetings also occur every three months where supporters are invited by ballot and are invited to ask questions to the board. In 2011, the club supported a supporter-based initiative for an official anthem to boost the atmosphere at Villa Park. The song "The Bells Are Ringing" is to be played before games.

Like many English football clubs, Aston Villa has had several hooligan firms associated with it: Villa Youth, Steamers, Villa Hardcore and the C-Crew, the last mentioned being very active during the 1970s and 1980s. As can be seen across the whole of English football, the hooligan groups have now been marginalised. In 2004, several Villa firms were involved in a fight with QPR fans outside Villa Park in which a steward died. The main groupings of supporters can now be found in a number of domestic and international supporters' clubs. This includes the Official Aston Villa Supporters Club which also has many smaller regional and international sections. There were several independent supporters clubs during the reign of Doug Ellis but most of these disbanded after his retirement. The supporter group My Old Man Said formed to stand up for Villa supporters' rights, as a direct result of Villa supporters' protest against the club's appointment of Alex McLeish. The club's supporters also publish fanzines such as Heroes and Villains and The Holy Trinity.

Aston Villa's arch-rivals are Birmingham City, with games between the two clubs known as the Second City Derby. Historically though, West Bromwich Albion have arguably been Villa's greatest rivals, a view highlighted in a fan survey, conducted in 2003. The two teams contested three FA Cup finals in the late 19th century. Villa also enjoy less heated local rivalries with Wolverhampton Wanderers and Coventry City. Through the relegation of West Brom and Birmingham City, to the Football League Championship, in the 2005–06 season, at the start of 2006–07 Premiership season, Villa were the only Midlands club in that League. For the 2010–11 season, West Bromwich Albion were promoted and joined Aston Villa, Wolverhampton Wanderers, and Birmingham City in the Premier League. This marked the first time that the "West Midlands' Big Four" clubs have been in the Premier League at the same time, and the first time together in the top flight since the 1983–84 season. Birmingham were relegated at the end of the 2010–11 season, ending this period.

The rivalry was renewed in 2016/17 when Aston Villa suffered relegation from the Premier League. They were joined by West Brom for the 2018/19 season, but was once again ended when Villa won promotion back to the Premier League

Statistics 

Season 2022-23 is Aston Villa's 109th season in the top tier of English football. The only club to have spent longer in the top flight are Everton, with 120 seasons, making Aston Villa versus Everton the most-played fixture in English top-flight football. Aston Villa were relegated from the top tier of English football in 2016, having played in every Premier League season since its establishment in 1992–93, but were promoted back in 2018–19. They are ninth in the All-time FA Premier League table, and have the fifth highest total of major honours (20) won by an English club.

Aston Villa currently hold the record number of league goals scored by any team in the English top flight; 128 goals were scored in the 1930–31 season, one more than Arsenal who won the league that season for the very first time, with Villa runners-up. Villa forward Archie Hunter became the first player to score in every round of the FA Cup in Villa's victorious 1887 campaign. Villa's longest unbeaten home run in the FA Cup spanned 13 years and 19 games, from 1888 to 1901.

Aston Villa are one of five English teams to have won the European Cup. They did so on 26 May 1982 in Rotterdam, beating Bayern Munich 1–0 thanks to Peter Withe's goal.

Club honours 

Aston Villa have won European and domestic league honours. The club's last English honour was in 1996 when they won the League Cup, and most recently they won the 2001 UEFA Intertoto Cup.

Domestic 

League
First Division / Premier League 
Winners (7): 1893–94, 1895–96, 1896–97, 1898–99, 1899–1900, 1909–10, 1980–81
 Second Division / First Division / Championship 
Winners: 1937–38, 1959–60
Play-off winners: 2018–19
 Third Division / Second Division / League One 
Winners: 1971–72

Cups
FA Cup
Winners (7): 1886–87, 1894–95, 1896–97, 1904–05, 1912–13, 1919–20, 1956–57
Football League Cup / EFL Cup
Winners (5): 1960–61, 1974–75, 1976–77, 1993–94, 1995–96
FA Charity Shield / FA Community Shield
Winners: 1981
 Sheriff of London Charity Shield
Winners: 1899, 1901

European 

European Cup / UEFA Champions League
Winners: 1981–82
European Super Cup / UEFA Super Cup
Winners: 1982
Intertoto Cup
Winners: 2001

Players

First team squad 
, official first team squad including youth players that have made their senior league debut.

On loan

Under 21s and Academy 

Players to have made their senior league debut are listed in the senior squad.

Out on loan

Notable players 

There have been many players who can be called notable throughout Aston Villa's history. These can be classified and recorded in several forms. The Halls of Fame and PFA Players of the Year are noted below. , Aston Villa are only surpassed by Tottenham Hotspur (78), for providing the most England internationals with 74 Villa players debuting for England, this record is jointly held with Liverpool. Aston Villa have had several players who were one-club men, including inaugural club Hall of Fame inductee Billy Walker. In 1998, to celebrate the 100th season of League football, The Football League released a list entitled the Football League 100 Legends that consisted of "100 legendary football players." There were seven players included on the list who played for Villa: Danny Blanchflower, Trevor Ford, Archie Hunter, Sam Hardy, Paul McGrath, Peter Schmeichel and Clem Stephenson.

Aston Villa have had a number of players who have been successful on the international stage while they were at the club. Emiliano Martínez has won all his senior Argentina caps to date while at Aston Villa, having debuted in June 2021. He is currently the most decorated international player for Aston Villa having won the 2021 Copa América, the 2022 Finalissima and the 2022 FIFA World Cup; he was awarded the Golden Glove awards at both the Copa América and World Cup; he was subsequently awarded the The Best FIFA Goalkeeper award in February 2023. Paul McGrath and Steve Staunton  (Republic of Ireland), as well as Olof Mellberg (Sweden) all captained their national sides in the 1990, 2002 and 2006 World Cups respectively. McGrath appeared nine times at the World Cup while at Aston Villa, a record for an active Villa player.

Three Aston Villa players have won the PFA Players' Player of the Year award. In 1977 Andy Gray won the award. In 1990 it was awarded to David Platt, whilst Paul McGrath won it in 1993. The PFA Young Player of the Year, which is awarded to players under the age of 23, has been awarded to four players from Aston Villa: Andy Gray in 1977; Gary Shaw in 1981; Ashley Young in 2009 and James Milner in 2010. The National Football Museum in Preston, Lancashire administers the English Football Hall of Fame which currently contains one Villa team, five Villa players and one manager. The 1982 European Cup-winning team were inducted into the Hall of Fame in October 2011. Former Aston Villa players named in the Hall of Fame are Clem Stephenson, Danny Blanchflower, Peter Schmeichel, Cyrille Regis, and Paul McGrath; as well as former manager Joe Mercer.

In 2006 the club announced the creation of an "Aston Villa Hall of Fame." This was voted for by fans and the inaugural induction saw 12 former players, managers and directors named. Former club captain Stiliyan Petrov was added to the list in May 2013. 

  Gordon Cowans
  Eric Houghton
  Brian Little
  Dennis Mortimer
  Stiliyan Petrov
  Ron Saunders
  Peter Withe
  Paul McGrath
  Peter McParland
  Charlie Aitken
  William McGregor
  George Ramsay
  Billy Walker

Non-playing staff

Corporate hierarchy 
Source:

Management hierarchy

Notable managers 

The following managers have all won at least one trophy when in charge or have been notable for Villa in the context of the League, for example Jozef Vengloš who holds a League record.

In popular culture 

Aston Villa were the subject, together with Sunderland, of one of the earliest football paintings in the world – possibly the earliest – when in 1895 the artist Thomas M. M. Hemy painted a picture of a game between the teams at Sunderland's then ground Newcastle Road.

A number of television programmes have included references to Aston Villa over the past few decades. In the sitcom Porridge, the character Lennie Godber is a Villa supporter. When filming began on Dad's Army, Villa fan Ian Lavender was allowed to choose Frank Pike's scarf from an array in the BBC wardrobe; he chose a claret and blue one – Aston Villa's colours. The character Nessa in the BBC sitcom Gavin & Stacey was revealed as an Aston Villa fan in an episode screened in December 2009.

In the 1952 film The Card, the main character Denry Machin (Alec Guinness) becomes a town councillor and purchases the rights to locally born Aston Villa player 'Callear', the "greatest centre-forward in England", for the failing local football club.

Villa have also featured on several occasions in prose. Stanley Woolley, a character in Derek Robinson's Booker shortlisted novel Goshawk Squadron is an Aston Villa fan and names a pre-war starting eleven Villa side. Together with The Oval, Villa Park is referenced by the poet Philip Larkin in his poem about the First World War, MCMXIV. Aston Villa are also mentioned in Harold Pinter's play The Dumb Waiter.
The club receive a passing mention in Aldous Huxley's debut novel Crome Yellow.

Notable supporters of Aston Villa include Prince William, former Prime Minister David Cameron, musician Ozzy Osbourne, actor Tom Hanks, and golfer Justin Rose.

Aston Villa Women

Aston Villa have a women's football side that compete in the Women's Super League having been promoted as champions of the 2019-20 FA Women's Championship. They were founded as Solihull F.C. in 1973 and affiliated to Aston Villa in 1989.

Footnotes 

A. In 2001 Aston Villa were one of three co-winners of the Intertoto Cup with Paris Saint-Germain and Troyes AC. The club also won all of their 2008 Intertoto Cup rounds to be named joint-winners and progress to the UEFA Cup, the format was changed in 2006 to award the Intertoto Trophy to the side progressing furthest in the UEFA Cup, which was S.C. Braga.
B. Up until 1992, the top division of English football was the Football League First Division. The Premier League took over from the First Division as the top tier of the English football league system upon its formation in 1992. The First Division then became the second tier of English football, the Second Division became the third tier, and so on. The First Division is now known as the Football League Championship, while the Second Division is now known as Football League One.
C Saunders was never a player for Aston Villa; he was the manager from 1974 to 1982.
D Win% is rounded to two decimal places

References 
 Specific

 Works cited

External links 

Aston Villa News – Sky Sports

Aston Villa results and records at statto.com

 
1874 establishments in England
Association football clubs established in 1874
Football clubs in Birmingham, West Midlands
Football clubs in the West Midlands (county)
Sport in Birmingham, West Midlands
Football clubs in England
FA Cup winners
EFL Cup winners
UEFA Champions League winning clubs
UEFA Super Cup winning clubs
The Football League founder members
Premier League clubs
Former English Football League clubs
UEFA Intertoto Cup winning clubs